The Dean of Southwark is the head (primus inter pares – first among equals) and chair of the chapter of canons, the ruling body of Southwark Cathedral. The dean and chapter are based at the Cathedral and Collegiate Church of Saint Saviour and Saint Mary Overie in Southwark. Before 2000 the post was designated as a provost, which was then the equivalent of a dean at most English cathedrals. The cathedral is the mother church of the Anglican Diocese of Southwark and seat of the Bishop of Southwark. The current dean is Andrew Nunn.

List of deans

Provosts
1937–1938 John Haldane
1939–1941 Frederick Narborough
1944–1947 Cuthbert Bardsley
1948–1957 Hugh Ashdown
1957–1961 George Reindorp
1961–1970 Ernest Southcott
1970–1982 Harold Frankham
1983–1994 David Edwards
1994–2000 Colin Slee (became Dean)

Deans
2000–November 2010 Colin Slee
21 January 2012present Andrew Nunn (retirement announced for 4 July 2023)

References

Deans of Southwark
Deans of Southwark
 
Deans of Southwark